Croatia competed at the 2000 Summer Olympics in Sydney, Australia.

Medalists

Athletics

Men
Track & road events

Field events

Women
Track & road events

Field events

Canoeing

Slalom

Sprint
Men

Rowing

Sailing

Men

Open

Shooting

Men

Women

Swimming

Men

Women

Table tennis

Men

Women

Taekwondo

Women

Tennis

Men

Women

Volleyball

Women's Team Competition

Preliminary round

Group A

16 September 2000

18 September 2000

20 September 2000

22 September 2000

24 September 2000

Quarter-finals
26 September 2000

5–8th place
27 September 2000

7th place
28 September 2000

Roster

Marija Anzulović
Elena Cebukina
Patricia Daničić
Biljana Gligorović

Barbara Jelić
Vesna Jelić
Gordana Jurcan
Ana Kaštelan

Nataša Leto
Marijana Ribičić
Beti Rimac
Ingrid Siscovich

Water polo

Men's Team Competition

Preliminary round

Group B

Quarterfinals

Classification 5th–8th

Classification 7th–8th

Roster

 Siniša Školneković
 Elvis Fatović
 Dubravko Šimenc
 Ognjen Kržić
 Ratko Štritof

 Mile Smodlaka
 Ivo Ivaniš
 Alen Bošković
 Samir Barač

 Igor Hinić
 Frano Vićan
 Vjekoslav Kobešćak
 Višeslav Sarić

Weightlifting

References

sports-reference
Wallechinsky, David (2004). The Complete Book of the Summer Olympics (Athens 2004 Edition). Toronto, Canada. . 
International Olympic Committee (2001). The Results. Retrieved 12 November 2005.
Sydney Organising Committee for the Olympic Games (2001). Official Report of the XXVII Olympiad Volume 1: Preparing for the Games. Retrieved 20 November 2005.
Sydney Organising Committee for the Olympic Games (2001). Official Report of the XXVII Olympiad Volume 2: Celebrating the Games. Retrieved 20 November 2005.
Sydney Organising Committee for the Olympic Games (2001). The Results. Retrieved 20 November 2005.
International Olympic Committee Web Site

Nations at the 2000 Summer Olympics
2000
Olympics